Union Sportive Musulmane d'Oujda (USMO) is a Moroccan football club currently playing in the second division Botola 2. The club was founded in 1958 and is located in the city of Oujda, Morocco.

References

Football clubs in Morocco
Oujda
1958 establishments in Morocco